Elif Batuman (born 1977) is an American author, academic, and journalist. She is the author of three books: a memoir, The Possessed, and the novels The Idiot, which was a finalist for the 2018 Pulitzer Prize for Fiction, and Either/Or. Batuman is a staff writer for The New Yorker.

Early life
Elif Batuman was born in New York City to Turkish parents, and grew up in New Jersey. She graduated from Harvard College, and received her doctorate in comparative literature from Stanford University. While attending graduate school, Batuman studied the Uzbek language in Samarkand, Uzbekistan. Her dissertation, The Windmill and the Giant: Double-Entry Bookkeeping in the Novel, is about the process of social research and solitary construction undertaken by novelists.

Career
In February 2010, Batuman published her first book, The Possessed: Adventures with Russian Books and the People Who Read Them, based on material she previously published in The New Yorker, Harper's Magazine, and N+1, which details her experiences as a comparative literature graduate student at Stanford University. Reviewing the book for The New York Times, critic Dwight Garner praised the "winsome and infectious delight she feels in the presence of literary genius and beauty."

Batuman’s novel The Idiot is partly based on her own experiences attending Harvard in the mid-1990s and teaching English in Hungary in the summer of 1996. It was a finalist for the 2018 Pulitzer Prize for Fiction.

Batuman was writer-in-residence at Koç University in Istanbul, Turkey,
from 2010 to 2013. She now lives in New York. In 2016, she met her partner; she writes that this relationship, her first non-heterosexual one, "resulted in a series of changes to [her] views not just of gender but also of genre" as Batuman realized how influential film and narrative had been to her ideas about how women should behave.

Batuman's 2018 article in The New Yorker on Japan's rental family industry won the National Magazine Award. In 2021, the magazine returned the award after an investigation revealed that three subjects in the essay had made false statements to Batuman and the magazine's fact-checkers.

Influences 
Russian literature figures heavily in Batuman's work. Batuman says that her obsession with Russian literature began when she read Aleksandr Solzhenitsyn’s The Gulag Archipelago in high school. Both The Possessed and The Idiot pay homage to Batuman's favorite Russian writer, Fyodor Dostoevsky.

Personal life 
Batuman identifies as queer and stopped dating men at age 38. In an interview, she discussed reading Adrienne Rich's essay Compulsory Heterosexuality and Lesbian Existence after beginning to date her current partner, a woman, after a lifetime of dating only men, and how it related to certain behaviors by her protagonist Selin.

Bibliography

Books
 
The Idiot, Penguin Press, 2017. .
Either/Or, Penguin Press, 2022. .

Essays, reporting and other contributions
Elif Batuman (Jan 16, 2006), "Cool Heart". The New Yorker.

 Göbekli Tepe
Two Rivers. Carolyn Drake, self-published, 2013. . Edition of 700 copies. By Carolyn Drake. Accompanied by a separate book with a short essay by Batuman and notes by Drake.

Interviews
 Elif Batuman in conversation with Full Stop (December 14, 2011).
 "The books that made me" | "My stress read? Epictetus during a dental procedure", The Guardian (April 28, 2018).
  Elif Batuman on the Longform Podcast (June 6, 2018).
Elif Batuman, interviewed by Yen Pham for White Review (June, 2017)
Elif Batuman, interviewed by The Daily Stoic
Elif Batuman, interviewed by Cecilia Barron for The College Hill Independent

Awards
Rona Jaffe Foundation Writers' Award, 2007.
Whiting Award, 2010.
Finalist for the Pulitzer Prize, 2017.

References

External links
Elif Batuman's personal website

Living people
1977 births
American expatriates in Turkey
American memoirists
American people of Turkish descent
Harvard Advocate alumni
Harvard College alumni
The New Yorker people
Rona Jaffe Foundation Writers' Award winners
Stanford University alumni
American women memoirists
Writers from New York City
21st-century American women
American LGBT writers